David Norman Mantell (22 July 1934 – 26 January 2017) was an English cricketer.  Mantell was a right-handed batsman who fielded as a wicket-keeper.  He was born at Acton, Middlesex.

Mantell made his first-class debut for Sussex against Cambridge University in 1954.  He made 25 further first-class appearances for the county, the last of which came against Essex in the 1958 County Championship.  In his 26 first-class matches for Sussex, he scored a total of 150 runs at an average of 6.00, with a high score of 34.  Behind the stumps he took 28 catches and made 2 stumpings.  Mantell found his opportunities limited, and when the regular Sussex wicketkeeper Rupert Webb announced he would retire from full-time cricket at the end of the 1958 season, Sussex encouraged Jim Parks, a far better batsman than Mantell, to take up wicketkeeping; that led Mantell to leave the county at the end of the 1958 season.

He died on 26 January 2017 at the age of 82.

References

External links
David Mantell at ESPNcricinfo
David Mantell at CricketArchive

1934 births
2017 deaths
People from Acton, London
English cricketers
Sussex cricketers
Wicket-keepers